Magash (Mağaş) is a rural locality (a village) in Krasnozilimsky Selsoviet, Arkhangelsky District, Bashkortostan, Russia. The population was 162 as of 2010. There are 6 streets.

Geography 
Magash is located 19 km southwest of Arkhangelskoye (the district's administrative centre) by road. Krasny Zilim is the nearest rural locality.

References 

Rural localities in Arkhangelsky District